The Great Swindle is a 1941 American mystery film directed by Lewis D. Collins and starring Jack Holt, Jonathan Hale and Henry Kolker.

Cast
 Jack Holt as Jack Regan 
 Jonathan Hale as Swann 
 Henry Kolker as Stewart Cordell 
 Marjorie Reynolds as Margaret Swann 
 Donald Douglas as Bill Farrow 
 Sidney Blackmer as Dave Lennox 
 Douglas Fowley as Rocky Andrews 
 Boyd Irwin as Thomas Marshall 
 Tom Kennedy as Capper Smith

References

Bibliography
 Darby, William. Masters of Lens and Light: A Checklist of Major Cinematographers and Their Feature Films. Scarecrow Press, 1991.

External links
 

1941 films
1941 mystery films
1940s English-language films
American black-and-white films
American mystery films
Films directed by Lewis D. Collins
Columbia Pictures films
1940s American films